Than Htay (born 12 November 1954) is a Burmese politician who served as Chairman of the Union Solidarity and Development Party from August 2016 to September 2022 due to medical treatment. He previously served as the Minister for Rail Transportation, and Minister for Energy. He is a retired brigadier general in the Myanmar Army.

Early life
Than Htay was born on 12 November 1954 in Ayeyarwady Region. When he was 17, he was accepted into the Defence Services Academy and earned a bachelor of arts and a master’s degree in defense.

Military and political career
Serving in the military until 2010, he peaked as a brigadier general. He left the army at the rank of brigadier general in 2003 to become deputy minister of energy, before being promoted to minister in 2011.

He joined the Union Solidarity and Development Party at its founding in the lead-up to the 2010 election. He won election to the Pyithu Hluttaw, representing Myanaung township, in the 2012 by-election.  In 2013, he became minister for energy and for railways. In January 2013, his ministry awarded two new deep-water oil and gas blocks to Thai energy firm PTT Exploration and Production without using a bidding process. The ministry also approved MPRL E&P to extend its contract without a bidding process to operate the Mann oil field in central Myanmar. Due to his controversial decisions over the awarding of exploration licenses and production concessions as a minister, Than Htay was transferred to the Ministry of Rail Transportation on 25 July 2013. He resigned from the post after Thein Sein picked him as a USDP candidate for the 2015 general election.

He publicly supported the controversial Protection of Race and Religion Laws — a set of four laws to regulate religious conversion and population-control measures that passed under sustained lobbying from ultra-nationalist groups.

In November 2015, he ran for re-election but was defeated. In the 2020 Myanmar general election, he won a House of Representatives seat representing Naypyitaw's Zeyathiri Township.

Personal life 
Than Htay is married to Soe Wut Yee.

References 

Union Solidarity and Development Party politicians
Members of Pyithu Hluttaw
Transport ministers of Myanmar
Energy ministers of Myanmar
Burmese military personnel
Burmese Buddhists
1954 births
Living people
People from Ayeyarwady Region
Defence Services Academy alumni